2nd Nikolskoye, rural localities in Russia, may refer to:

 2nd Nikolskoye, Kastorensky District, Kursk Oblast, a village
 2nd Nikolskoye, Medvensky District, Kursk Oblast, a village
 2nd Nikolskoye, Timsky District, Kursk Oblast, a village
 2nd Nikolskoye, Voronezh Oblast, a selo

 See also
 Nikolskoye 2-ye
 Nikolskoye